15m or 15M may refer to:

 15-meter band, an amateur radio frequency band
 15-M Movement, the 2011–2015 anti-austerity movement in Spain